Arjun College of Technology located at Coimbatore, Tamil Nadu, India, is a private self-financing engineering institute. It was established in 2013 as part of the Arjun Group of Concerns.  The college is approved by AICTE, New Delhi and affiliated to the Anna University, Chennai.

Location
The college is located at Thamaraikulam, Coimbatore-Pollachi highway, Coimbatore-642120. It is located at about 25 km from Coimbatore City and 10 kilometres from Pollachi.

Academics
The college offers four courses in Bachelor of Engineering (B.E.). All courses are affiliated to Anna University, Chennai.

Undergraduate Degree Courses (B.E.) 
 Electronics and Communication Engineering 
 Computer Science and Engineering 
 Mechanical Engineering
 Civil Engineering
 BTech – Artificial Intelligence and Data Science
 B.Tech - Computer Science and Business Systems

Admission procedure
Undergraduate students are admitted based on their 12th standard (higher secondary school) scores. The admissions are done through both government quota (GQ) through Tamil Nadu Engineering Admissions Counselling (TNEA Counselling) and management quota.

Eligibility :
For calculating the eligibility marks for admission, the marks secured by the students in Physics, Chemistry and Mathematics in HSC will be taken into account
For OC – 45 % (General Category)
BC, BCM, MBC, DNC, SC, SCA & ST  – 40%

Distance 
Coimbatore – 24 km
Pollachi – 10 km
Kinathukadavu-04 km
Tiruppur – 32 km
Palladam – 27 km
Dharapuram – 35 km
Udumalpet – 30 km
Valparai – 52 km

Sister Concerns – Arjun College of Technology 
1. Arjun Foundry, Coimbatore
2. Alpha Castings, Coimbatore
3. Srinivasan Associates Pvt. Ltd., Coimbatore
4. Nivasan Homes Pvt. Ltd., Coimbatore
5. Arjun Industries, Kovilpalayam, Coimbatore
6. Dicofix, Coimbatore
7. FACE(Focus Academy), Coimbatore
8. Gee Arr Spinners, Srivilliputhur
9. R.S. Engineering, Coimbatore
10. Arjun Nitrous Pvt. Ltd., Coimbatore
11. Neural Arc Global Pvt.
12. Aswin Ram Spinning Mills Pvt. Ltd.
13. Skills Tech Building Solutions
14.  Arjun Engineering Works.

Placement, Certification and Career Development Cell 
The services include:
•         Personal, Academic and Professional help
•         Internships, In- House Projects, Industrial Visits and Project Exhibitions
•         Workshops, Seminars, Conferences and Symposiums
•         Resume and Interview Preparation
•         In House Trainings in Aptitude, Personality Development, Time Management & Team Skills etc.,
•         On & Off Campus Recruitments

External links
 Arjun College of Technology,

Engineering colleges in Coimbatore